George Hurst may refer to:

 George Hurst (conductor) (1926–2012), British conductor
 George Hurst (artist) (born 1933), American leather artist
 George Samuel Hurst (1927–2010), health physicist, scientist, inventor, educator and innovator
 George Hurst (died 1986), founder of Hurst Performance

See also
 George Hirst (disambiguation)
 George Hearst (1820–1891), American businessman and politician
 George Randolph Hearst (1904–1972), eldest son of William Randolph Hearst
 George Randolph Hearst Jr. (1927–2012), chairman of the board of the Hearst Corporation